Sky Blue is the fifth studio album by American jazz composer Maria Schneider. The album was released in 2007 through ArtistShare and was nominated for two 2008 Grammy Awards for Best Large Jazz Ensemble and Best Instrumental Composition (for "Cerulean Skies").

Track listing

Personnel

 Maria Schneider – composer, liner notes, mixing, producer, bird calls
 Charles Pillow – alto saxophone, clarinet, flute, alto flute, bass flute, piccolo
 Steve Wilson  – alto saxophone, soprano saxophone, clarinet, flute, alto flute
 Rich Perry – flute, tenor saxophone, bird calls
 Donny McCaslin – clarinet, tenor saxophone
 Scott Robinson – baritone saxophone, clarinet, bass clarinet
 Jason Carder – trumpet, flügelhorn, bird calls
 Ingrid Jensen – trumpet, flügelhorn, bird calls, electronics
 Laurie Frink – trumpet, flügelhorn
 Tony Kadleck – trumpet, flügelhorn
 Marshall Gilkes – trombone, bird calls
 Ryan Keberle – trombone
 Keith O'Quinn – trombone
 George Flynn – bass trombone, contrabass trombone
 Frank Kimbrough – piano
 Gary Versace – accordion
 Ben Monder – guitar
 Jay Anderson – bass
 Clarence Penn – drums
 Gonzalo Grau – cajón, palmas, percussion
 Luciana Souza – vocals
 Pernell Saturnino – bird calls
 Gene Paul – mastering
 Joe Ferla – engineer, mixing

References

External links
Official site

2007 albums
Maria Schneider (musician) albums
Big band albums